Toolbrunup is among the highest peaks in the Stirling Ranges of Australia. Toolbrunup is made from sediments deposited during the Ediacaran Period and later metamorphosed to quartzites and shales. These formation rocks were later folded during basement rock movement.

The first European to climb the peak was Ensign Robert Dale,  who did so in 1832 when he passed through the area.
John Septimus Roe did the same three years later and the botanist James Drummond followed in the 1840s and returned several times to collect and identify plants in the area. 

The traditional owners of the area are the Minang and Koreng peoples. Toolbrunup shares its name with Lake Toolbrunup and the name is thought to mean "the place that has water when all else is dry".

References

Mountains of Western Australia
Great Southern (Western Australia)
Noongar placenames